The term AA-9 or AA9 may refer to:

 Gardiner's designated symbol for a hieroglyph (Aa9)